This is a list of people who have held the title of Caliph, the supreme religious and political leader of an Islamic state known as the Caliphate, and the title for the ruler of the Islamic Ummah, as the political successors to Muhammad. All years are according to the Common Era. Some Muslims believe that, after the death of Muhammad in 632, a succession crisis arose as Muhammad had not left a generally acknowledged heir.

Rashidun Caliphate (632–661)

Umayyad Caliphate (661–750)

Abbasid Caliphate (750–1258)

During the later period of Abbasid rule, Muslim rulers began using other titles, such as Amir al-umara and Sultan.

Mamluk Abbasid dynasty (1261–1517)

The Cairo Abbasids were largely ceremonial Caliphs under the patronage of the Mamluk Sultanate that existed after the takeover of the Ayyubid dynasty.

Ottoman Caliphate (1517–3 March 1924)

The head of the Ottoman dynasty was just entitled Sultan originally, but soon it started accumulating titles assumed from subjected peoples. Murad I (reigned 1362–1389) was the first Ottoman claimant to the title of Caliph; claimed the title after conquering Edirne.

The Office of the Ottoman Caliphate was transferred to the Grand National Assembly of Turkey which dissolved the office on March 3, 1924, in keeping with the policies of secularism that were adopted in the early years of the Republic of Turkey by its President Mustafa Kemal Atatürk.

After the abolition of the Caliphate, the Grand National Assembly of Turkey founded the Presidency of Religious Affairs as the new highest Islamic religious authority in the country.

Short-lived and disputed caliphates

Hasan ibn Ali's Caliphate (661)

After the death of Ali, the Muslims selected Hasan ibn Ali as the caliph. He somehow successfully made a treaty with governor Mu'awiyah that led to the latter assuming political power. Later, he abdicated as the caliph after ruling for six or seven months.

Abd Allah ibn al-Zubayr's Caliphate (684–692)

Abd Allah ibn al-Zubayr, the nephew of Aisha, the third wife of Muhammad led a rebellion against the Umayyad Caliphate in 684 AD. He was proclaimed caliph in Mecca but was defeated and killed there in 692 AD after a six-month siege by general Al-Hajjaj ibn Yusuf.

Talib al-Haqq (747–748)

Fatimid Caliphate (909–1171)

(The Fatimids were Isma'ili Shia who claimed to be descendants of Muhammad's daughter Fatimah and were seen as heretics by Sunnis. Their claims to a caliphate are also not recognized by the Muslim Ummah as a legitimate successor of the title of Caliph passed down from Muhammad, as no legitimate proof existed they were descendant from Fatimah).Bosworth 2004, p. 63

Caliphate of Córdoba (929–1031)
(Not universally accepted; actual authority confined to Spain and parts of Maghreb)

Almohad Caliphate (1145–1269)

(Not widely accepted, actual dominions were parts of North Africa and Iberia)

Bornu and Songhai Empires (15th/16th century)

Several rulers of West Africa adopted the title of Caliph. Mai Ali Ghaji ibn Dunama was the first ruler of Bornu Empire to assume the title. Askia Mohammad I of Songhai Empire also assumed the title around the same time.

Indian caliphates (late medieval/early modern)
Since the 12th century, despite the South Asian domination of numerous Muslim empires, kingdoms and sultanates, Islamic caliphates were not fully attempted to be established across the Indian subcontinent. However, under the sharia based reigns of Sunni emperors such as Alauddin Khalji, Mughal Empire's Aurangzeb, and Mysore's rulers Hyder Ali and Tipu Sultan, absolute forms of caliphates were clearly to have appeared. These largely impacted the French-Italian emperor Napoleone Bonaparte and soldiers of the British Empire.

Sokoto Caliphate (1804–1903)

(Not widely accepted, actual dominions were parts of West Africa)

Established by Tariqa Islamic scholar and religious leader Usman dan Fodio through the Fulani War (alternatively known as the Fulani Jihad), which sought to reduce the influence of pre-Islamic religious practices and spread a more vigorous form of Islam through the auspices of a Caliphate.

Ahmadiyya Caliphate (1908–present)

The Khalīfatul Masīh, sometimes simply referred to as Khalifah (i.e. Caliph, successor), is the elected spiritual and organizational leader of the worldwide Ahmadiyya Muslim Community and is the successor of Mirza Ghulam Ahmad, who had taken the titles of Mahdi and Messiah of Islam. The Caliph is believed to be divinely guided and is also referred to by members of current Khalifatul Masih is Mirza Masroor Ahmad.

After the death of Ghulam Ahmad, his successors directed the Ahmadiyya Muslim Community from Qadian in Punjab, British India, which remained the headquarters of the community until 1947 with the independence of Pakistan. From this time on, the headquarters moved to and remained in Rabwah, a town built on land bought in Pakistan by the community in 1948. In 1984, Ordinance XX was promulgated by the government of Pakistan which rendered the Khalifatul Masih unable to perform his duties and put the very institution in jeopardy. Due to these circumstances, Khalifatul Masih IV left Pakistan and migrated to London, England, provisionally moving the headquarters to the Fazl Mosque.

Sharifian Caliphate (1924–1925)

A last attempt at restoring the caliphal office and style with ecumenical recognition was made by Hussein bin Ali, King of Hejaz and Sharif of Mecca, who assumed both on 11 March 1924 and held them until 3 October 1924, when he passed the kingship to his son `Ali ibn al-Husayn al-Hashimi, who did not adopt the caliphal office and style. Like the Fatimid caliphs, he was a descendant of Muhammad through a grandson of Hasan ibn Ali. Hussein's claim for caliphate was not accepted by the Wahhabi and Salafi movements, and in 1925 he was driven from Hejaz by the forces of Ibn Saud as an outcome of the Second Saudi-Hashemite War. He continued to use the title of caliph during his remaining life in exile, until his death in 1931.

Islamic State (2014–present)

On 29 June 2014, the Islamic State proclaimed the return of the Islamic caliphate, with its first "caliph" as Amir al-Mu'minin Abu Bakr Ibrahim bin Awwad Al-Badri Al-Husaini Al-Hashimi Al-Quraishi As-sammera'i al-Baghdadi. The caliphate's claimed territory at its peak controlled 12 million people. At its height, Islamic State ruled territories in various countries including Iraq, Syria, Lebanon, Nigeria, Libya, the Philippines, Afghanistan, Congo, Yemen, and the Sinai region in Egypt, in addition to running guerrilla cells in many other countries.

In 2014-15, dozens of Salafi Jihadi groups and scholars around the world pledged alligience to ISIL claimed Caliphate. 

On 10 April 2018, during a rally of U.S. President Donald Trump in Elkhart, Indiana in support of Mike Braun’s bid for the US Senate, Vice President Mike Pence referred to ISIS as a Caliphate, claiming "ISIS is on the run, their Caliphate has crumbled, and we will soon drive them out of existence once and for all."

As of early, 2022 Islamic State occupies some territory in Nigeria and has 3 million people under its rule; and also it continues to maintain control over some of rural un-habitant areas in both Iraq and Syria

See also
 Worldwide caliphate
 Shah
 Emir
 Shaykh al-Islām
 List of Sheikh-ul-Islams of the Ottoman Empire
 Grand Imam of al-Azhar
 List of Grand Imams of al-Azhar
 List of presidents of Al-Azhar University
 Mouride#Leadership
 Succession to Muhammad
 History of Islam
 Shia Islam
 Sunni Islam
 Sharifate of Mecca

Notes

References

Bibliography
 
 
 

 
 
 
 
 

 
Caliphs
Caliphs
Caliphs
632 establishments
Medieval Islamic world-related lists